Jafriz (also Romanized as Jafrīz) is a village in Gughar Rural District, in the Central District of Baft County, Kerman Province, Iran. At the 2006 census, it had a population of 213 which included 52 families.

References 

Populated places in Baft County